The 1934 European Wrestling Championships were held in  the men's Freestyle style  in Stockholm 3 - 7 October 1934; the Greco-Romane style and  in Rome 26 - 30 April 1934.

Medal table

Medal summary

Men's freestyle

Men's Greco-Roman

References

External links
FILA Database

W
W
European Wrestling Championships
Euro
Euro
Sports competitions in Stockholm
Sports competitions in Rome
1934 in European sport